The 2010 World Junior Table Tennis Championships were held in Bratislava, Slovakia, from 4 to 11 December 2010. It was organised by the Slovak Table Tennis Federation under the auspices and authority of the International Table Tennis Federation (ITTF).

Medal summary

Events

Medal table

See also

2010 World Team Table Tennis Championships

References

World Junior Table Tennis Championships
World Junior Table Tennis Championships
World Junior Table Tennis Championships
World Junior Table Tennis Championships
Table tennis in Slovakia
International sports competitions hosted by Slovakia
World Junior Table Tennis Championships